Patterson station is a commuter rail stop on the Metro-North Railroad's Harlem Line, located in Patterson, New York.

It is the northernmost station on the line in Putnam County, and the first station beyond the end of electrification.

History
The New York and Harlem Railroad built their main line through Patterson towards Dover Plains in 1848, when Patterson station opened. NY&H was acquired by the New York Central and Hudson River Railroad in 1864 and eventually taken over by the New York Central Railroad. On August 3, 1952, a derailment of milk cars and other freight at the station took place, which resulted in no injuries or deaths, but nevertheless startled the community.   As with most of the Harlem Line, the merger of New York Central with Pennsylvania Railroad in 1968 transformed the station into a Penn Central Railroad station. Penn Central's continuous financial despair throughout the 1970s forced them to turn over their commuter service to the Metropolitan Transportation Authority, who eventually converted into a Metro-North station in 1983.

Station layout
The station consists of a four-car-long high-level side platform to the west of the track.

Notes

References

External links 

Patterson Railroad History

Metro-North Railroad stations in New York (state)
Former New York Central Railroad stations
Railway stations in Putnam County, New York
Railway stations in the United States opened in 1848
Transportation in Dutchess County, New York
1848 establishments in New York (state)